Ratatat Remixes Vol. 2 is the second self-released remix album by the Brooklyn indie electronic/alternative rock duo Ratatat. It includes performances from hip-hop artists U.G.K., Notorious B.I.G., Jay-Z, Kanye West, Memphis Bleek, and Z-Ro.

Background
Several of the tracks feature beats from the 9 Beats set of leaked demos as their backing music:

 Memphis Bleek's Alright uses beat #1
 Young Buck's Shorty Wanna Ride uses beat #2
 Notorious B.I.G.'s Dead Wrong uses beat #3
 Young Buck, The Game & Ludacris's Stomp uses beat #4
 Slim Thug, Bun B, and T.I.'s 3 Kings uses beat #6

Track listing
Young Buck, The Game & Ludacris – "Stomp" – 5:06
Notorious B.I.G. – "Party & Bullshit" – 3:55
Jay-Z & Notorious B.I.G. – "Allure" – 4:23
Z-Ro, Devin the Dude & Juvenile – "The Mule" – 3:55
Young Buck – "Shorty Wanna Ride" – 3:50
Beanie Sigel & Jay-Z – "Glock Nines" – 4:07
Despot – "Freestyle" – 1:38
Memphis Bleek – "Alright" – 4:12
Slim Thug, T.I. & Bun-B – "Three Kings" – 4:54
Young Jeezy & Bun-B – "Over Here" – 4:30
Kanye West – "Diamonds" – 3:36
Beans – "Freestyle" – 2:23
Notorious B.I.G. – "Dead Wrong" – 3:10
Saigon & U.G.K. – "We Gon' Ride" – 3:56

References

External links
Official Ratatat website

Ratatat albums
2007 mixtape albums
2007 remix albums
Self-released albums
Albums produced by E*vax